Malik Ahsan Ahmad Jamil (born 29 August 1989) is a Dutch cricketer. He played for the Netherlands in the 2014 ICC World Twenty20 tournament.

Career
Malik made his first-class cricket debut against Scotland on 21 June 2011. He also played for the Netherlands national cricket team in One Day Internationals (ODIs) and Twenty20 Internationals (T20Is). His Twenty20 International best bowling figures of 5/19 was against South Africa in ICC World Twenty20 2014. He was also the joint top wicket taker in the tournament. He took eleven wickets against Nepal in four T20I matches in July 2015, and was the joint player of the series with Nepal's Paras Khadka. Malik's figures of 5/19 in a T20I are the best by a bowler in a losing cause and are the best figures in a T20 World Cup match in a losing cause.

During the 2015 ICC World Twenty20 Qualifier Malik was reported for bowling with an illegal action following the Netherlands win over Scotland on 11 July. He was not allowed to take any further part in the tournament, until an independent assessment has taken place. Following rehabilitative training, Malik's action was cleared by the ICC six months later, and he returned to international cricket against the UAE in the Intercontinental Cup in January 2016.

References

External links

1989 births
Living people
Dutch cricketers
Netherlands One Day International cricketers
Netherlands Twenty20 International cricketers
Sportspeople from Rotterdam